William Francis (16 February 1817 - 19 January 1904) was a British chemist, scientific author and publisher.

Early life 
He was born in London, the son of Richard Taylor (1781-1858), an English naturalist and publisher of scientific journals, and Frances Marshall Francis (1797–1854). He attended University College School before studying abroad in France and Germany. After studying chemistry and biology at University of London he obtained a Ph.D at the University of Giessen in 1842 under Liebig.

Career 
He established and edited the Chemical Gazette from 1842 to 1859 when it merged with the Chemical News. He edited the Philosophical Magazine from 1851 and the Annals and Magazine of Natural History from 1859. He translated and published many works on chemistry.

In 1841 he was one of the original members of the Chemical Society. He was also a fellow of the Linnean Society of London, the Royal Astronomical Society and the Physical Society of London.

in 1852, together with Richard Taylor, he established Taylor & Francis as scientific publishers.

Personal life 
In 1862 he married Isabella Gray Taunton (1841-1899); their children born in Richmond were William (1864), Isabella (1868), Lucy (1872). He died at the Manor House, Sheen Road, Richmond and is buried in  Richmond Old Cemetery.

References 

1817 births
1904 deaths
19th-century British chemists
British magazine publishers (people)
Fellows of the Linnean Society of London
Burials at Richmond Cemetery